The Neftchi Baku 2008–09 season was Neftchi Baku's seventeenth Azerbaijan Premier League season. They started the season under the management of Anatoliy Demyanenko, however he was replaced by Hans-Jürgen Gede on 1 September 2008. On 28 February 2009 Gede was replaced Boyukaga Agaev, who was in charge until the end of the season. They finished 8th in the league and were knocked out of the Azerbaijan Cup at the quarterfinal stage by Karabakh. Neftchi also took part in the UEFA Intertoto Cup, reaching the Third Round before losing to Vaslui of Romania.

Squad

Transfers

Summer

In:

Out:

Winter

In:

Out:

Competitions

Azerbaijan Premier League

Results

Table

Azerbaijan Cup

Intertoto Cup

Squad statistics

Appearances and goals

|-
|colspan="14"|Players who appeared for Neftchi Baku who left during the season:

|}

Goal scorers

Notes 
 On 31 October 2008, FK NBC Salyan changed their name to FK Mughan.
 Qarabağ have played their home games at the Tofiq Bahramov Stadium since 1993 due to the ongoing situation in Quzanlı.

References

External links 
 Neftchi Baku at Soccerway.com

Neftçi PFK seasons
Neftchi Baku